The following is a list of information systems journals, containing academic journals that cover information systems. The list given here contains the most influential, currently publishing journals in the field.

To understand which are the best journals for a particular Information Systems (IS) field of study, one needs to understand that IS is a multidisciplinary research area and that the "IS discipline draws on the social science as well as the engineering research traditions.  The social science tradition is represented by the economics-based and behavioral research, whereas the engineering tradition is epitomized by the design science approach in IS research."

Top management information systems journals 
The following journals were selected by the Association for Information Systems Senior Scholars as a top basket of journals.
 European Journal of Information Systems (EJIS)
 Information Systems Journal (ISJ)
 Information Systems Research (ISR)
 Journal of the AIS (JAIS)
 Journal of Information Technology (JIT)
 Journal of Management Information Systems (JMIS)
 Journal of Strategic Information Systems (JSIS)
 Management Information Systems Quarterly (MISQ)

Management journals that publish information systems research 
 Electronic Markets
 Management Science
 Organization Science

Top information systems journals with an engineering tradition, epitomized by the design science approach 
 Decision Support Systems (DSS)
 Business & Information Systems Engineering (BISE)

References 

Information systems journals